Akbaba may refer to:

Places
Akbaba, Bartın, village in Bartın Province, Turkey
Akbaba, Istanbul, neighborhood in Beykoz district of Istanbul Province, Turkey
Akbaba, Sultandağı, village in Afyonkarahisar Province, Turkey

People with the surname
 Çağlar Şahin Akbaba (born 1995), Turkish footballer
 Emre Akbaba (born 1992), Turkish footballer
 Kemal Akbaba (born 1988), Turkish footballer

Other
 Akbaba (periodical) humor and satire magazine published in Turkey.

Turkish-language surnames